is a 2011 crossover sports and party game developed by Sega Japan. It was published by Nintendo in Japan and Korea and by Sega elsewhere. As the third instalment in the Mario & Sonic series, it was released on the Wii on 11 November 2011 in North America, 18 November 2011 in Europe, and 26 December 2011 in Japan. It was also released for the Nintendo 3DS in February 2012. Mario & Sonic is the official video game of the 2012 Summer Olympics and is licensed by the International Olympic Committee through exclusive licensee International Sports Multimedia. The game is the only Wii title to come in a yellow keep case.

The game on the Wii and 3DS comprises a collection of numerous events based on the Olympic Games. Players assume the role of a Mario or Sonic character while competing against the others in Olympic events. Mario & Sonic received mostly mixed reviews from critics upon release, with many criticising its gameplay as underwhelming. It proved to be commercially successful and was followed by a fourth game in the series, Mario & Sonic at the Sochi 2014 Olympic Winter Games, which was released in November 2013 for the Wii U.

Gameplay

Mario & Sonic at the London 2012 Olympic Games comprises a collection of numerous events based on the modern Olympic Games. The game brings together the two titular characters and 18 more from both franchises to participate in environments based on the official venues of the 2012 Summer Olympics in London. Each character has unique attributes which can serve as an advantage or disadvantage depending on the event. As with the game's predecessor, all player-characters are divided into four categories: all-around, speed, power, and skill.

The Wii version features a total of 30 Olympic events, including football, badminton, horse riding, canoeing, and volleyball. Re-imagined versions of previously existing events such as athletics, aquatics, and table tennis also appear. The game introduces new cooperative mechanics including "Dream Events", alternate versions of Olympic events that take place in locations from previous games of the Mario and Sonic series, and a challenge mode, which enables players to repeat complete challenges in various events. "London Party" mode takes place on a board game-like depiction of London in which four players may compete in various sporting events and minigames. The ultimate objective is to collect enough stickers to fill up a "tourist book" – the player who completes the book first wins. Upon the completion of any event, players earn scratch cards which can be redeemed in the game's "Bonus Mode" for rewards such as Mii costumes and additional music. Unlike Mario & Sonic at the Olympic Winter Games, the Wii version of Mario & Sonic at the London 2012 Olympic Games does not support the Balance Board.

The 3DS version has over 50 Olympic-based events in single-player and multiplayer. Among these events which are not included in the Wii version include fencing, BMX racing, and weight-lifting, with the latter involving the use of the 3DS's microphone. Like the Nintendo DS counterpart of Mario & Sonic at the Olympic Winter Games, it also contains an exclusive "Story Mode" which entails the characters from Mario and Sonic the Hedgehog's worlds working against their respective antagonists, Bowser and Doctor Eggman, who are trying to use fog machines to prevent the games from being held.

Development and release

The first game in the series, Mario & Sonic at the Olympic Games, was the first official crossover title to feature characters from both the Super Mario and Sonic the Hedgehog franchises. The Olympic Games were chosen as a setting since Sega and Nintendo felt its competitive sportsmanship was ideal for the once-rival mascots Sonic the Hedgehog and Mario. Sonic the Hedgehog is the protagonist of the video game series released by Sega in order to provide the company with a mascot to rival Nintendo's flagship character Mario in the early 1990s. The game proved to be a commercial success and encouraged Sega and Nintendo to develop a sequel, Mario & Sonic at the Olympic Winter Games. Shortly after its release, the vice president of marketing at Sega of America, Sean Ratcliffe, commented that the company would likely commission a sequel for the 2012 Summer Olympics in London if the franchise continued to capture interest among consumers.

Mario & Sonic at the London 2012 Olympic Games was officially announced with a joint press release by Sega and Nintendo on 21 April 2011, after its predecessors sold over 19 million units combined. As with its predecessor, Sega's Osamu Ohashi and Nintendo's Hiroshi Sato served as producers, Eigo Kasahara as director, and Teruhiko Nakagawa as lead composer. Mario & Sonic is the only official video game of the 2012 Summer Olympics and is licensed by the International Olympic Committee through exclusive licensee International Sports Multimedia. A peripheral was considered to launch alongside the game early in its development, although its nature remains unknown.

Both the Wii and 3DS versions were developed by Sega Sports Japan and published by Nintendo for Japan and Korea and Sega for North America and Europe. Over 100 people developed the game. The Wii version carries the distinction of being the only title to come in a yellow keep case. Nintendo re-released the 3DS version of the game as a downloadable title via Nintendo eShop on 1 November 2012 in Japan, on 30 May 2013 in the PAL regions, and on 20 June 2013 in North America. The Wii version sold 2.4 million copies in North America and Europe in its first two months of release. Mario & Sonic at the London 2012 Olympic Games was followed by a sequel, Mario & Sonic at the Sochi 2014 Olympic Winter Games, which was released worldwide for the Wii U in November 2013.

Reception

The game received mixed to average reviews upon release. Both the Wii and 3DS versions hold an average score of 66 percent at Metacritic, with the Wii version based on an aggregate of 38 reviews and the 3DS version of 28 reviews.

Chris Scullion from the Official Nintendo Magazine asserted that the Wii version was a "step sideways" for the series, regarding the gameplay and lack of challenge as an overall underwhelming experience for an individual player. John Minkley of Eurogamer likewise thought the game failed to replicate the "charming" and inclusive formula of its predecessors, saying that many of its game modes remained too similar and "undercooked", despite new additions. While Mike Anderiesz from The Guardian opined that the game may not have done justice to either of the franchise's universes in light of their distinctive environment and visuals, he did commend Mario & Sonic as a "colourful diversion" for its young target audience. GamesRadar+s Neilie Johnson lamented on the game's overall lack of new content and predictability, although he singled out the "London Party" mode as "fun" and the only part of the game which took full advantage of the UK setting. Likewise, both Mark Langshaw of Digital Spy and Lucas Thomas of IGN complained that the game rehashed many elements of its predecessors. Langshaw ultimately heralded the game's colourful cartoon-like aesthetic and wide array of characters as bolstering appeal for the younger generation, and felt that part of its appeal was the fact that none of Olympic events featured offer accurate representations of their real life counterparts. Thomas praised the game's presentation of London and said that its prominent depiction of world-famous landmarks alongside Mario and Sonic the Hedgehog characters elevated the overall experience to which its predecessors did not emulate.  He also felt that the game's non-support of the Wii MotionPlus, available shortly after its predecessor, was a missed opportunity for the series.

On the Nintendo 3DS, reviewers found the game to be largely similar to its Wii counterpart. Tom East from the Official Nintendo Magazine found that the 3DS version was a marginal improvement over the Wii version, praising its "outstanding" soundtrack and the novelty of seeing characters from both franchises interact with each other as factors which add a degree of longevity to the game. Shane Jury of Cubed3 praised the crisp visuals of the 3DS version, remarking that the characters are animated "incredibly well" and felt that the game's overall vibrant and colourful atmosphere and 3D capabilities helped make it stand out from the Wii version, albeit lightly. While IGN's Richard George thought that some of the minigames "fared better" than its Wii counterpart in terms of replay value, he expressed disappointment over the "embarrassing design" of certain minigames and criticised its "shallow attempts" of replicating some Olympic events.

Notes

References

External links
 

2011 video games
2012 video games
2012 Summer Olympics
Mario & Sonic at the Olympic Games
Mario sports games
Nintendo 3DS games
Nintendo 3DS eShop games
Nintendo Network games
Crossover video games
Nintendo Wi-Fi Connection games
Summer Olympic video games
Sega video games
Video games set in 2012
Video games set in London
Wii Wi-Fi games
Video game sequels
Video games scored by Jun Senoue
Video games scored by Tomoya Ohtani
Pack-in video games
Cancelled Nintendo DS games
Video games developed in Japan
Multiplayer and single-player video games